The 1997 Carolina Panthers season was the franchise's 3rd season in the National Football League and the 3rd under head coach Dom Capers. They failed to improve upon their 12–4 record in 1996, and make it to the playoffs for the second time in franchise history and finished 7–9. The Panthers appeared on Monday Night Football for the first time in franchise history, where they faced the Dallas Cowboys and won by a score of 23–13.

Offseason

NFL Draft

Personnel

Staff

Roster

Schedule

Standings

References 

Carolina Panthers seasons
Carolina Panthers
Carolina